Lars Bergström (born 1952) is a Swedish professor of theoretical physics specializing in  astroparticle physics at Stockholm University, AlbaNova campus. He is a member of the Royal Swedish Academy of Sciences and since 2004 serves as the secretary of the Nobel Committee for Physics.

Education and Academic Career
Bergström received his PhD 1981 from the Royal Institute of Technology, with a thesis by the title of ``Aspects of bound states in hadron physics". After a postdoctoral fellowship at CERN, he was nominated docent in theoretical physics at the Royal Institute of Technology. Afterwards, he was appointed professor of theoretical physics at Uppsala University, before becoming associate professor at Stockholm University in 1995. From 2008 to 2014 he has served as director of the Oskar Klein Centre for Cosmoparticle Physics.

Contributions 
Bergström has worked at the interface of particle physics, astrophysics and cosmology. He has collaborated in numerous international experiments, including AMANDA, IceCube and Fermi. His contributions have been exceptionally important in the field of dark matter indirect detection, through the search of annihilation products of dark matter in the Universe. Together with Paolo Gondolo, Joakim Edsjö, Piero Ullio, Mia Schelke and Edward Baltz, he developed DarkSUSY, a famous numerical package for neutralino dark matter calculations. Bergström has also contributed importantly to the field of supersymmetry, particularly studying supersymmetric dark matter candidates. Bergström has published over 100 papers in peer-reviewed journals.

Papers 
 Papers listed on the Smithsonian/NASA Astrophysics Data System (ADS)

Books
 "Cosmology and Particle Physics"; Bergström with Ariel Goobar, 2nd ed. Springer (2004).

References

External links 
 Oskar Klein Centres web site
 Physics Department of Stockholm university

1952 births
Living people
Swedish physicists
Stockholm University alumni
Members of the Royal Swedish Academy of Sciences
Theoretical physicists
People associated with CERN